Afsar Asadi (born 16 January 1958) is an Iranian actress and make-up artist.

Filmography

As an actress 

 Movies 

 TV Series

As a make-up artist

Awards 

 Best Supporting Actress, Fajr Film Festival, for Obour Az Ghobar (1990)
 Nominated for Best Supporting Actress, Fajr Film Festival, for Rousari-e Aabi (1995)

See also 

 Iranian women
 Iranian cinema
 List of famous Persian women
 Persian women's movement
 Fajr International Film Festival

Notes

References 
imdb profile
Soureh Cinema profile

External links 

Profile on Soureh Cinema website 
fmdb profile 

1958 births
Living people
People from Mianeh
Iranian film actresses
Iranian make-up artists
Persian-language women poets
Iranian television actresses
20th-century Iranian actresses
21st-century Iranian actresses
Crystal Simorgh for Best Supporting Actress winners